Ambar Khirid Roy  (5 June 1945 – 19 September 1997) was an Indian cricketer who played in four Test matches in 1969.

In his first Test innings Roy scored 48 against New Zealand at Nagpur. He did not score well in subsequent matches, and after poor scores against Australia at Delhi and Kolkata later in the season, he was dropped. In his final Test match, at his home ground Kolkata, he scored 18 and 19.

References

1945 births
1997 deaths
Cricketers from Kolkata
India Test cricketers
Indian cricketers
East Zone cricketers
Indian Universities cricketers
Bengal cricketers
State Bank of India cricketers
Vazir Sultan Tobacco cricketers